Gorgeous is the 2nd mini-album released by the South Korean boy band, F.Cuz. The album was released in physical and digital format on November 18, 2010.  The mini-album was also released in Japan and Taiwan on December 8, 2010 and December 16, 2010, respectively.

Track listing

References

External links
 Official website 

2010 EPs
KMP Holdings EPs
F.Cuz albums